Bernadito M. "Ben" Leito (6 February 1923 – September 1996) was a Curaçaoan economist, politician and administrator. He served as Governor of the Netherlands Antilles from 1970 until 1983, and the Dutch Council of State from 1987 until 1993.

Biography
Leito was born on 6 February 1923 in Curaçao. He went to the Netherlands to attend the Hogere Burgerschool (high school) in Leiden. In 1945, he studied economy at Tilburg University, and graduated in 1950.

In 1952, Leito became a civil servant in Curaçao, and started to work for the finance department in 1953. He was a candidate in the 1954 Netherlands Antilles general election for the Catholic People's Party, but did not get elected. In 1961, he became head of finance for Curaçao, and was promoted head of finance for the Netherlands Antilles in 1965. In 1968, he served as acting Lieutenant governor of Curaçao.

The 1969 Curaçao uprising resulted in the resignation of the Cola Debrot as Governor of the Netherlands Antilles. On 30 December 1969, Leito was appointed acting governor. The States General of the Netherlands nominated Efraïn Jonckheer as new governor, however the Estates of the Netherlands Antilles rejected the nomination, and Leito was installed as Governor of the Netherlands Antilles effective 16 June 1970. Leito was the first Afro-Curaçaoan governor of the Antilles.

In the early 1970s, the Dutch government under Joop den Uyl tried to persuade the Netherlands Antilles to seek independence. Leito was opposed to independence for the islands, and provided backing for the Isa-Beaujon and Evertsz cabinets in their denouncement. In 1980, Leito applied to become a member of the Council of State, the advisory body for the Dutch government, however his application was rejected. In March 1983, Leito resigned as governor effective 30 April. On 1 March 1987, Leito was appointed to the Council of State, and served until 6 February 1993.

Leito died in September 1996, at the age of 73.

Honours
  Commander in the Order of the Netherlands Lion.
  Officer in the Order of Orange-Nassau.
  Grand Cordon in the Order of the Liberator.
  Grand Cross in the Order of Merit of Duarte, Sánchez and Mella.

References

1923 births
1996 deaths
Governors of the Netherlands Antilles
Curaçao politicians
Members of the Council of State (Netherlands)
Tilburg University alumni
Place of death missing
Curaçao people of African descent
Commanders of the Order of the Netherlands Lion
Officers of the Order of Orange-Nassau
Order of Merit of Duarte, Sánchez and Mella